Athivetti is a village located near Madukkur Block, Pattukkottai taluk, Thanjavur District, Tamil Nadu State, India.

During the formation of Indian National Army, many men in Singapore from Athivetti joined INA.

Sub villages
Athivetti is composed of the following villages
 Pichinikkadu
 Gandhi Nagar
 Anna Nagar
 Vadakikadu (North Street)
 Therkikadu (South Street)
 Mathankadu
 Vandayankadu
 Kovillkadu
 Maravakkadu

Economy
Agriculture is basic occupation of this village. Paddy is their first choice of cultivation. Sugar cane is also cultivated there. Poultry is also available there. Most of the men are in foreign countries.

About
This village is situated in Pattukkottai Taluk, Thanjavur District. Even though this village was classified under The Madras Impartible Estates Act 1909, as a Zamin village. The zamindar system was old and was abolished in the year 1948.
The total extend of land of this village is 2441.5 acres including nearly 100 acres of forest and nearly 150 acres of water storage tanks. Paddy and coconut are two major cultivations.
Government Primary Health Centre was established in 1990 and it has completed 25 years of service to public.
One government high school is there which was established in 1973. Four government primary schools are there.
This village has two village administrative officers even though a single revenue village.
This village has three hamlets Pichinikkadu, Maravakkadu and Kovilkadu as mentioned in revenue records.
Once this village was educationally backward. First graduate of this village came in the middle of the 1960s. Now education is very much improved, younger generation of this village spread all over the world. Their earnings improved the wealth of the village.
People worshiping village gods like mariamman, vairavar, perichiyappar, mulaikkottu amman and number of local deities. Anandavalli mariamman temple festival takes place every year in the month of chitrai (April–May). Festival starts from kappukattuthal (Tieing Turmeric with Thread) Fifteenth day Sunday is the festival day kavadi is an important event.  Next day Monday  "Manja Thanni vilaiyattu" (Water mixed with turmeric powder, poured the water on the Harigen) in the evening, and drama in the night. On the same day(Monday) At Pichinikkadu mulaikkottu amman temple mulaipari and manjathanni vilaiyattu festival will take place. Next day in Pidarikovil drama will be performed. These 15-16 days are called "Kapputhadai" no other functions will not take place in the village.
An oldest temple in this village called siva temple situated at kovilkadu. In this temple an inscription dated 22.08.1255 Third Rajendra Chola ruling period. This temple might be older than the date above mentioned. This inscription was quoted by a famous historian K.A.Neelakanda sastry in his famous book "Cholas" in page 438 at foot note 91. The name of the god is Sounderesvara sami and female god Soundaranayaki.
Marriages in the earlier period took place within the village people themselves called as Endogamy. Now brides and grooms come from out of the village increased much more.
This village is in the forefront having number of freedom fighters especially I.N.A freedom fighters. Periyathambi Mazhavarayar affectionately called as "Athivetti Gandhi" had cut his fingers for the cause of national freedom as well as social cause. In 1942 he was imprisoned for 8 months at Alipore (Andhrapradesh). Second time also imprisoned at Pattukkottau. Younger generation will take him as a role model for national social causes.
Dispute redressal system is functioning in this village Comparatively very good called as panchayat. The panchayat system of this village is a notable one in the surrounding area.
Traditional village arts disappeared T.V. and mobile phone occupied its place. Earlier times people themselves took part as performers of art, now they become only as audience

Villages in Thanjavur district